Nonstructural protein 3 (NS3), also known as p-70, is a viral nonstructural protein that is 70 kDa cleavage product of the hepatitis C virus polyprotein. It acts as a serine protease. C-terminal two-thirds of the protein also acts as helicase and nucleoside triphosphatase. First (N-terminal) 180 aminoacids of NS3 has additional role as cofactor domains for NS2 protein.

See also
 Boceprevir, sovaprevir, paritaprevir and telaprevir - drugs targeting this protein

References

External links
 http://www.uniprot.org/uniprot/Q91RS4

Viral nonstructural proteins
Hepatitis C virus